The following outline is provided as an overview of and topical guide to the past and present terrorism in the United States:

Although terrorism has been given several different definitions, it is most commonly defined as the use of violence to achieve political goals.

Political terrorism has accounted for the majority of attacks in recent decades (a trend that has accelerated in recent years), while Islamist terrorism has accounted for the majority of deaths.

Designated foreign terrorist organizations by the United States
 Abu Nidal Organization
 Abu Sayyaf Group
 Al-Aqsa Martyrs Brigade
 Al Qaeda
 al-Qaeda in Iraq
 Ansar al-Islam
 Armed Islamic Group
 Asbat al-Ansar
 Aum Shinrikyo
 Caucasus Emirate
 Communist Party of the Philippines
 Continuity Irish Republican Army
 Egyptian Islamic Jihad
 Euskadi ta Askatasuna
 Gama'a al-Islamiyya
 Hamas
 Harakat ul-Mujahidin
 Hezbollah
 Islamic Jihad Union
 Islamic Movement of Uzbekistan
 Izz ad-Din al-Qassam Brigades
 Jaish-e-Mohammed
 Jemaah Islamiya
 Kach and Kahane Chai
 Kurdistan Workers' Party
 Lashkar-e-Taiba
 Lashkar-e-Jhangvi
 Liberation Tigers of Tamil Eelam
 Libyan Islamic Fighting Group
 Moroccan Islamic Combatant Group
 Palestine Liberation Front
 Palestinian Islamic Jihad
 Popular Front for the Liberation of Palestine
 Popular Front for the Liberation of Palestine – General Command
 Real IRA
 Revolutionary Armed Forces of Colombia
 Revolutionary Nuclei
 Revolutionary Organization 17 November
 Revolutionary People's Liberation Party/Front
 Shining Path
 United Self-Defense Forces of Colombia

Domestic violent extremist organizations
The following are political extremist groups that have used violence:

 Animal Liberation Front
 Army of God (USA)
 Aryan Nations
 Atomwaffen Division
 Earth Liberation Front
 Ku Klux Klan
 Phineas Priesthood
 The Base
 Proud Boys

Inactive domestic violent extremist organizations
The following are violent extremist organizations that have been responsible for terrorist attacks on United States soil. These organizations are no longer active.

Domestic terrorist attacks
The following is a list of terrorist attacks that have happened throughout United States history, which were committed by United States citizens.
 May 21, 1856: Sacking of Lawrence
 May 24, 1856 – May 25, 1856: Pottawatomie massacre
 September 11, 1857: Mountain Meadows massacre
 April 14, 1865: Assassination of Abraham Lincoln
 October 24, 1871: Chinese massacre
 May 4, 1886: Haymarket affair
 November 10, 1898: Wilmington insurrection
 September 6, 1901: Assassination of William McKinley
 October 1, 1910: Los Angeles Times bombing
 July 22, 1916: Preparedness Day bombing
 May–July 1917: East St. Louis riots
 May–October 1919: Red Summer
 April–June 1919: U.S. anarchist bombings
 September 16, 1920: Wall Street bombing
 May 31 – June 1, 1921: burning of Black Wall Street
 January, 1923: razing and massacre of Rosewood
 May 18, 1927: Bath School Disaster
 December 25, 1951: Murder of Harry and Harriette Moore
 October 12, 1958: Bombing of the Hebrew Benevolent Congregation Temple
 September 15, 1963: 16th Street Baptist Church Bombing
 November 22, 1963: Assassination of John F. Kennedy
 February 16, 1970: San Francisco Police Department Park Station bombing
 May 29, 1970: Oakland pipe bombing
 August 24, 1970: Sterling Hall bombing
 November 7, 1983: 1983 U.S. Senate bombing
 April 19, 1995: Oklahoma City bombing
 July 27, 1996: Centennial Olympic Park bombing
 October 13, 2000: Firebombing of Temple Beth El (Syracuse)
 September 18, 2001 – October 9, 2001: Anthrax attacks
 May 2002: Midwest pipe bombings
 October 2002: Beltway Sniper Attacks
 March 3, 2006: Mohammed Reza Taheri-azar SUV attack
 July 28, 2006: Seattle Jewish Federation shooting 
 July 27, 2008: Knoxville Unitarian Universalist church shooting
 May 31, 2009: Assassination of George Tiller
 June 1, 2009: Little Rock recruiting office shooting
 June 10, 2009: United States Holocaust Memorial Museum shooting
 November 5, 2009: Fort Hood shooting
 February 18, 2010: Austin suicide attack
 September 1, 2010: Discovery Communications headquarters hostage crisis
 August 5, 2012: Wisconsin Sikh temple shooting
 April 15, 2013: Boston Marathon bombing
 June 8, 2014: Las Vegas shootings
 September 12, 2014: Pennsylvania State Police barracks attack
 October 23, 2014: Queens hatchet attack
 June 17, 2015: Charleston church shooting
 November 27, 2015: Colorado Springs Planned Parenthood shooting
 December 2, 2015: San Bernardino attack
 June 12, 2016: Orlando nightclub shooting
 September 17–19, 2016: New York and New Jersey bombings
 November 28, 2016: Ohio State University attack
 April 18, 2017: Fresno shootings
 May 26, 2017: Portland train attack
 June 14, 2017: Congressional baseball shooting
 August 12, 2017: Charlottesville car attack
 September 24, 2017: Burnette Chapel shooting
 October 31, 2017: New York City truck attack
 August 3, 2019: El Paso shooting
 January 15, 2022: Colleyville synagogue hostage crisis

Foreign terrorist attacks
The following are terrorist attacks that have occurred throughout United States history, which have been committed by foreign organizations and individuals.
 July 30, 1916: Black Tom explosion
 December 29, 1975: LaGuardia Airport Christmas Bomb
 August 29 – October 10, 1984: 1984 Rajneeshee bioterror attack
 January 25, 1993: CIA Shooting – Mir Qazi
 February 26, 1993: First World Trade Center bombing
 February 23, 1997: Empire State Building shooting
 September 11, 2001: September 11, 2001 attacks
 July 4, 2002: 2002 Los Angeles Airport shooting
 May 3, 2015: Curtis Culwell Center attack
 December 2, 2015: 2015 San Bernardino attack
 June 12, 2016: Orlando nightclub shooting
 September 17, 2016: 2016 St. Cloud, Minnesota knife attack
 October 31, 2017: 2017 New York City truck attack 
 December 6, 2019: Naval Air Station Pensacola shooting

Politically violent individuals
The following are individuals that have posed threats to United States security in the past, or have been involved in terrorist attacks.

 Umar Farouk Abdulmutallab
 Jane Alpert
 Dwight Armstrong
 Karleton Armstrong
 Mohamed Atta
 Anwar al-Awlaki
 H. Rap Brown
 James Wenneker von Brunn
 Leo Burt
 Zvonko Bušić
 Zachary Adam Chesser
 Linda Evans
 David Fine
 Hesham Mohamed Hadayet
 Nidal Malik Hasan
 Bruce E. Ivins
 Ted Kaczynski
 Ali Hassan Abu Kamal
 Osama Bin Laden
 Colleen LaRose
 James J. Lee
 Timothy McVeigh
 Sam Melville
 George Metesky
 Thomas Mooney
 John Allen Muhammad
 Terry Nichols
 José Padilla
 Aimal Qazi
 Eric Robert Rudolph
 Dawud Salahuddin
 Al-Shabaab
 Faisal Shahzad
 Hosam Maher Husein Smadi
 Mohammed Reza Taheri-azar
 Laura Whitehorn
 Ramzi Yousef

Worldviews within terrorism
The following are common worldviews that have motivated political activists to utilize violence.

 anarchist
 anti-fascist
 black supremacist
 Boogalooism
 Bordigist
 communist
 De Leonist
 Đilasist
 eco-terrorist
 ethnic
 guerrilla
 Guevarist
 Hoxhaist
 Islamic Extremism in the United States
 Islamic fundamentalists
 far left
 far right
 fascist
 Leninist
 Luxemburgist
 Maoist
 Marxist
 militia movement
 militant
 nationalist
 Neo-Confederate
 neo-luddite
 neo-Nazi
 New Left
 Posadist
 paramilitary
 rebel
 religious
 resistance movements
 revolutionary
 separatist
 socialist
 Stalinist
 Titoist
 Trotskyist
 white supremacist
 vigilante

Methods used in terrorism
The following is a list of techniques that have been utilized by politically violent individuals in terrorist attacks. 
 agro-terrorism
 arson
 assassination
 bioterrorism
 bombing
 car bombing
 chemical terrorism
 cyberterrorism
 dirty bomb
 dry run
 environmental terrorism
 firebombing
 food poisoning
 genocide
 hijacking
 hostage
 individual terror
 insurgency
 kidnapping
 letter bomb
 paper terrorism
 piracy
 proxy bomb
 shooting
 stabbing
 suicide bombing
 vehicle-ramming attack

United States counter-terrorism organizations
The following is a list of federal organizations in the United States that combat terrorism according to The U.S. Department of State's website.

US Department of State
 Bureau of Consular Affairs
 Bureau of Diplomatic Security
 Bureau of Democracy, Human Rights, and Labor
 Bureau of Economic, Energy, and Business Affairs
 Bureau of Intelligence and Research
 Bureau of International Narcotics and Law Enforcement Affairs
 Bureau of International Security and Nonproliferation
 Bureau of Political-Military Affairs
 Foreign Service Institute
 Under Secretary for Public Diplomacy and Public Affairs
 United States Mission to the United Nations

Department of Defense
 Defense Intelligence Agency
 The War on Terror

Department of the Treasury
 Office of Foreign Assets Control
 Office of Terrorism and Financial Intelligence

Department of Justice
 Federal Bureau of Investigation
 FBI Most Wanted Terrorists

Department of Homeland Security
 Coast Guard
 Customs and Border Protection
 Air Forces Northern National Security Emergency Preparedness Directorate
 Immigration and Customs Enforcement
 Transportation Security Administration
 U.S. Secret Service

Other agencies
 Central Intelligence Agency
 Office of the Director of National Intelligence
 National Counterterrorism Center
 Agency for International Development

The following are other United States counter-terrorism agencies according to various sources.
 Air Force Office of Special Investigations
 Counterintelligence Field Activity
 Defense Criminal Investigative Service
 Diplomatic Security Service
 Naval Criminal Investigative Service
 National Counterterrorism Center (as part of the Office of the Director of National Intelligence) 
 Office of the National Counterintelligence Executive
 United States Army Counterintelligence
 United States Army Intelligence and Security Command

See also
 Counter-Terrorism
 Domestic terrorism in the United States
 History of homeland security in the United States
 List of designated terrorist organizations
 List of terrorist incidents
 State Terrorism
 Terrorism
 Terrorism in the United States
 United States and state terrorism

References

 1
terrorism in the United States
terrorism in the United States